Giant wētā are several species of wētā in the genus Deinacrida of the family Anostostomatidae. Giant wētā are endemic to New Zealand and all but one species are protected by law because they are considered at risk of extinction.

There are eleven species of giant wētā, most of which are larger than other wētā, despite the latter also being large by insect standards. This is, however, abnormal, as this individual was unmated and retained an abnormal number of eggs. The largest species of giant wētā is the Little Barrier Island giant wētā, also known as the wētāpunga.

Giant wētā tend to be less social and more passive than other wētā. Their genus name, Deinacrida, means "terrible grasshopper", from the Greek word δεινός (deinos, meaning "terrible", "potent", or "fearfully great"), in the same way dinosaur means "terrible lizard". They are found primarily on New Zealand offshore islands, having been almost exterminated on the mainland islands by introduced mammalian pests.

Habitat and distribution 

Most populations of giant wētā have been in decline since humans began modifying the New Zealand environment. All but one giant wētā species is protected by law because they are considered at risk of extinction. Three arboreal giant wētā species are found in the north of New Zealand and now restricted to mammal-free habitats. This is because the declining abundance of most wētā species, particularly giant wētā, can be attributed to the introduction of mammalian predators, habitat destruction, and habitat modification by introduced mammalian browsers. New populations of some wētā have been established in locations, particularly on islands, where these threats have been eliminated or severely reduced in order to reduce the risk of extinction. Deinacrida heteracantha, and D. fallai are found only on near-shore islands that have no introduced predators (Te Hauturu-o-Toi and Poor Knights Island). The closely related species D. mahoenui is restricted to habitat fragments in North Island.

Two closely related giant wētā species are less arboreal. Deinacrida rugosa is restricted to mammal-free reserves and D. parva is found near Kaikoura in South Island New Zealand. 

Many giant wētā species are alpine specialists. Five species are only found at high elevation in South Island.

Species list
Deinacrida carinata, Herekopare wētā
Deinacrida connectens, Scree wētā
Deinacrida elegans, Bluff wētā
Deinacrida fallai, Poor Knights giant wētā
Deinacrida heteracantha, Little Barrier Island giant wētā
Deinacrida mahoenui, Mahoenui giant wētā
Deinacrida parva, Kaikoura giant wētā
Deinacrida pluvialis, Mt Cook giant wētā
Deinacrida rugosa, Cook Strait giant wētā
Deinacrida talpa, Giant mole wētā
Deinacrida tibiospina, Mt Arthur giant wētā

References

External links

Saving New Zealand's prehistoric giant weta. Earthrise, Al Jazeera English, June 2018 (video, 10:22 mins)

Weta
Anostostomatidae